Carl Heinrich Johann Schenck was a German technology pioneer and businessman who established Carl Schenck Eisengießerei & Waagenfabrik in 1881, in Darmstadt, Germany. The company was the first manufacturer of the industrial balancing machine. It is known today as Carl Schenck AG, and has been a subsidiary of the global technology conglomerate, Dürr AG, since 1999.

Memoriam
The Carl Schenck Award, offered annually by the Technical University in Darmstadt, is dedicated to him. The TU campus houses two units of Dürr's Measuring and Process Systems division: the Balancing and Assembly Products unit (BAP); and the Schenck Technologie und Industriepark.

References

Businesspeople from Darmstadt